Ernest Sugira (born March 27, 1991) is a Rwandan professional footballer who plays as a forward for Al-Wahda SC and the Rwanda national team.

Career
He began his youth career as a midfielder at AS Muhanga at an early age and led to a Rwandan cup final with the club. In June 2013 he joined  Armée Patriotique Rwandaise F.C. In March 2014, he scored a goal in a rout of Amavubi Stars 4-0 in the 2013–14 Rwanda National Football League Also, in the Rwandan Cup also known as Peace cup, he missed a penalty in a penalty shootout against his former club AS Muhanga but despite that, his team won 10-9 to advance to the next round. With Armée Patriotique Rwandaise F.C., he won a double in the season 2013-2014 Rwandan Football season. In September 2014, Sugira signed to AS Kigali among with two other APR FC players to join the club. In the Rwamagana pre season tournament, he scored a goal in a semifinal against Mukura Victory Sports FC and ultimately won the trophy in the final against the host Sunrise FC. Then in December 2014, he won yet another trophy in the Ombudsman cup final against Police FC.

In May 2016, Ernest Sugira signed with AS Vita Club, a Democratic Republic of Congo's club, and joined the club for a two years contract.

International career
Ernest Sugira made his debut for Rwanda at the age of 22 against Benin in September 2013 for the 2014 FIFA World Cup qualification match. He scored his first international goal against the Mozambique national football team in 2017 Africa Cup of Nations qualifier in Maputo. In January 2016, he played the 2016 African Nations Championship in Rwanda and scored 3 goals in 4 matches. He led Rwanda to the knock-out stages of a major competition for the first time in their history by scoring a brace against the Gabon national football team. He was eventually named the Man of the match. Although he found the back of the net again as Rwanda national football team played its quarter final match against the DR Congo national football team, it did not suffice as the host went on to lose  2-1 in extra time. However, Ernest Sugira was included in the team of the tournament. On 26 January 2021 in CAMEROON, LIMBE stadium; SUGIRA scored a brace in 3-2 win against TOGO in the last match of group stage of 2021 African Nations championship and for another time SUGIRA qualified his native country to the quarter final of the tournament.

International goals
Scores and results list Rwanda's goal tally first.
 
12 rwanda vs Togo in Cameroon

References
https://www.bbc.com/sport/football/35360395?print=true
http://www.radiookapi.net/2016/05/18/actualite/sport/foot-rdc-le-rwandais-ernest-sugira-sengage-avec-vclub-pour-deux-ans

External links
 

Living people
1991 births
Rwandan footballers
AS Kigali FC players
AS Vita Club players
Rwanda international footballers
Rwandan expatriate footballers
Expatriate footballers in the Democratic Republic of the Congo
Rwandan expatriate sportspeople in the Democratic Republic of the Congo
Association football forwards
Rwanda A' international footballers
2016 African Nations Championship players
2020 African Nations Championship players